This is the list of Olympic records in weightlifting. Records are maintained in each weight class for the snatch lift, clean and jerk lift, and the total for both lifts.

The weight classes for men on the Olympic program were adjusted for the 2000 Games, so Olympic records only exist based on the results during and after that. Women's weightlifting made its Olympic debut at the 2000 Games in Sydney, with seven weight classes that have not changed since.

Current records

Men
♦ denotes a performance that is also a current world record. Statistics are correct as of 17 December 2021.

Women

Historical records

Men (1998–2018)
♦ denotes a performance that is also a current world record. Statistics are correct as of 31 October 2018.

Women (1998–2018)
♦ denotes a performance that is also a current world record. Statistics are correct as of 31 October 2018.

See also 
 List of Paralympic records in powerlifting

References 

 
 

Weightlifting
Weightlifting at the Olympics
Olympic